XHPB-FM is a Mexican radio station in Veracruz, Veracruz. It is owned by Grupo FM and is known as Mar FM 99.7.

History
XHPB was founded by Félix Malpica Mimendi and his son Félix Malpica Valverde with the awarding of a concession on March 10, 1970. It was the first FM radio station in the Veracruz/Boca del Río area (and the first main FM service in the state, though XEOM-FM Coatzacoalcos had already received its concession), originally known as PB Stereo. The station later changed its name to Estéreo Mar and then Mar FM.

References

Radio stations in Veracruz